Bob Ray Offenhauser (February 8, 1927 - May 12, 2016) was an American architect who designed mega-mansions with high ceilings. One of them, Palazzo di Amore, was the most expensive property on the market in the United States in 2014.

Further reading

References

1927 births
2016 deaths
USC School of Architecture alumni
Architects from California